Mohammad Reza Akbari Bisheh, (born September 20, 1986 in Isfahan, Iran) is a professional Iranian basketball player who currently plays for Foolad Mahan of the Iranian Super League and also for the Iranian national basketball team. He is a six-foot-four-inch shooting guard.

Akbari is also a member of the Iran national basketball team.  He first played for the team during their first ever gold medal run at the FIBA Asia Championship 2007.  He saw action in five of nine games off the bench for the Iranians at the FIBA Asia Championship 2009, where the team won its second consecutive gold medal to qualify for the 2010 FIBA World Championship.

Honours

National team
Asian Championship
Gold medal: 2007, 2009
Asian Under-18 Championship
Gold medal: 2004

References 

Living people
1986 births
Iranian men's basketball players
Shooting guards
Small forwards
Zob Ahan Esfahan F.C. sportspeople